Emerald Hill is a hill (and unofficial suburb or locality name) in the suburb of Birchville, Upper Hutt, New Zealand. The name Emerald Hill has been applied by developers Golden Homes Wellington Ltd to a housing development they are constructing on the north-eastern slopes of Emerald Hill. This development consists of around 4 or 5 streets off the end of Gemstone Drive.

The Metlink bus route 110 operates between Petone and the intersection of Emerald Hill Road with Gemstone Drive half-hourly during the day.

References

Suburbs of Upper Hutt